The Ariete-class torpedo boats were a group of destroyer escorts built for the Italian Navy during World War II. They were enlarged versions of the s and designed to escort convoys to North Africa. Of the 42 units planned, sixteen ships were eventually ordered but only one was completed by the time of the armistice, Ariete, built in the Sestri Ponente shipyards and commissioned on 5 August 1943. The namesake ship was also the only one to survive the war. After the war it was ceded to the Yugoslav Navy (1949), and renamed Durmitor.

Most of the other ships were captured and completed by the Germans, entered service with the Kriegsmarine as Torpedoboot Ausland and eventually sunk in the course of operations across the Aegean and the Adriatic. Fionda (renamed TA46 by the Germans) was sunk in Fiume by an Allied bomber on 20 February 1945, together with her twin Balestra / TA47. Both ships at the time were unfinished. Recovered by the Yugoslavians in 1947, it was used to complete TA47, which entered service in the Yugoslavian Navy as Učka. It was decommissioned in 1971.

Design

Compared to the Spica class it was developed from, the Ariete class had lost one of the three /47 caliber dual-purpose guns, whereas torpedo armament had grown from four to six  torpedo tubes, in two triple mountings on the ship's centreline. The anti-aircraft suite included ten 20 mm cannons.

Ships

References

Notes
  Cantieri Navali del Quarnaro, Fiume
  Cantieri Riuniti dell'Adriatico, Trieste

Citations

Bibliography

External links
 Classe Ariete Marina Militare website

 
Torpedo boat classes
World War II torpedo boats of Italy
Ships built in Italy
Torpedo boats of the Regia Marina